Endeca was a software company headquartered in Cambridge, Massachusetts, that sold eCommerce search, customer experience management, enterprise search and business intelligence applications. Endeca was founded in 1999 as Optigrab and was a privately held company, backed by venture capital investment from Bessemer, DN Capital, Ampersand, GGV, In-Q-Tel, Intel, SAP and Venrock. On October 18, 2011, Oracle Corporation announced its acquisition of Endeca for $1.075B.

Endeca's product provided faceted search, particularly in the context of electronic commerce and online libraries. It was considered a leader in the enterprise search and information access market by industry analyst firms Gartner, IDC, and Forrester Research

See also
Oracle Advertising and Customer Experience (CX)

References

Software companies established in 1999
Companies based in Cambridge, Massachusetts
Search engine software
1999 establishments in Massachusetts